The Macedonian Translators Association (acronym MATA) is a professional association of translators based in Skopje, North Macedonia.

It has already held four international conferences.

MATA is a partner organization with IAPTI.

References

Translation associations
Professional associations based in North Macedonia
Organizations established in 2010
2010 establishments in the Republic of Macedonia